The Monsanto House of the Future was an attraction at Disneyland's Tomorrowland in Anaheim, California, USA, from 1957 to 1967. It offered a tour of a futuristic home, and was intended to demonstrate the versatility of modern plastics.

History
Sponsored by Monsanto Company, the House of the Future was made possible by Monsanto, the Massachusetts Institute of Technology (MIT), and Walt Disney Imagineering. With this project, Monsanto wanted to demonstrate plastic's versatility as a high-quality, engineered material. The design team for this innovative structure included MIT architecture faculty Richard Hamilton and Marvin Goody (founders of Goody Clancy) and MIT civil engineering faculty Albert G. H. Dietz, Frank J. Heger, Jr. (a founder of Simpson Gumpertz & Heger) and Frederick J. McGarry. The MIT faculty worked with the Engineering Department of Monsanto's Plastics Division, including R. P. Whittier and M. F. Gigliotti.  The house, featuring four symmetric wings cantilevered off a central core, was fabricated with glass-reinforced plastics.

The attraction offered a tour of a home of the future, featuring household appliances such as microwave ovens, which eventually became commonplace.  The house saw over 435,000 visitors within the first six weeks of opening, and ultimately saw over 20 million visitors before being closed.

The house closed in 1967. The building was so sturdy that when demolition crews failed to demolish the house using wrecking balls, torches, chainsaws, and jackhammers, it was ultimately demolished using choker chains to crush it into smaller parts.  The plastic structure was so strong that the half-inch steel bolts used to mount it to its foundation broke before the structure itself did.

The reinforced concrete foundation was never removed and remains in its original location, now the Pixie Hollow, where it has been painted green and is used as a planter. The concrete base can be seen covered in camouflage and netting over the top of Disneyland's signature "Go Away Green" paint behind the Pixie Hollow sign.

Legacy
The House of the Future has had a significant impact on later design at Disney and Epcot. In February 2008, Disney announced it would conceptually bring back the attraction with a more modern and accessible interior. The $15 million Innoventions Dream Home was a collaboration of the Walt Disney Company, Microsoft, Hewlett-Packard, software maker LifeWare, and homebuilder Taylor Morrison.

In 2010, MIT Museum Architecture Curator Gary Van Zante gave a presentation on campus where he showed archived drawings and photographs of the plastic house. The talk, titled Back to the Future: A 1950s House of the Future, was part of the Cambridge Science Festival.

The attraction served as the basis for The Wonderful World of Mickey Mouse episode "House of Tomorrow".

See also
 List of former Disneyland attractions

References

External links
Monsanto House of the Future at Yesterland
Jetsetmodern references to: House of the Future, Xanadu etc.
Homes of the Future of the Past The pages listed on this list of links are partly not available anymore
House of the Future, 1957 (on YouTube)
Mickey Mouse Park Information on the Monsanto House of the Future
Go Away Green

Former Walt Disney Parks and Resorts attractions
Tomorrowland
Amusement rides introduced in 1957
Amusement rides that closed in 1967
Disneyland
Monsanto
Futures projects
1957 establishments in California
1967 disestablishments in California